Stromatopelma calceatum also known as the featherleg baboon tarantula, was first described by Johan Christian Fabricius in 1793. It is found in West Africa and has gone through a variety of scientific names during its existence.

Description 
Females live up to 15 years, while males only live to 4 years. The carapace is a tan creamy color, with some black striping, the opisthosoma is a tan creamy color with a black fishbone pattern. The legs are the same color covered in orangish hairs.

Behavior 
They are an arboreal old world tarantula, creating a tube like web, in the lower forest regions. They are quite a defensive tarantula, and will usually stay inside their webs until night. Though adults are arboreal, younger specimens have been observed burrowing.

References 

Spiders of Africa
Spiders described in 1793
Theraphosidae